Mosleh Uddin Ahmed is a Awami League politician and the former Member of Parliament of Dhaka-25.

Career
Ahmed was elected to parliament from Dhaka-25 as an Awami League candidate in 1973.

References

Awami League politicians
Living people
1st Jatiya Sangsad members
Year of birth missing (living people)